Ton & Gelli Boys & Girls Football Club are a Welsh football club from Ton Pentre in Rhondda Cynon Taf, Wales. They play in the South Wales Alliance League Division Two, which is at the sixth tier of the Welsh football pyramid.

History
The club were formed in 1925. The were reformed for the 1964–65 season and played in the Rhondda League, where they were champions in the 1968–69 season. They then entered the South Wales Amateur League in the 1970–71 season. The 1970’s were a period of success for the club, being league champions twice in 1973–74 and 1977–78 and runners-up in 1974–75 and 1976–77.

In 2015–16 the club joined the newly formed South Wales Alliance League as a Division One club, finishing third and gaining promotion to the Premier Division.

Honours
The clubs honours include:
South Wales Amateur League Division One
Champions: 1973–74, 1977–78
Runners up: 1974–75, 1976–77
South Wales Amateur League Division Two
Champions: 2009–10
Runners up: 2001–02, 
Rhondda & District League
Champions: 1968–69

External links
Club official website

References

Rhondda & District League clubs
South Wales Alliance League clubs
South Wales Amateur League clubs
1925 establishments in Wales
Football clubs in Wales
Association football clubs established in 1925
Sport in Rhondda Cynon Taf